Behringer is an audio equipment company founded by the Swiss engineer Uli Behringer on 25 January 1989, in Willich, Germany.  Behringer is known for producing a wide variety of synthesizers, mixers, audio interfaces, and amplifiers, along with various recording and performance accessories.

Though originally a German manufacturer, it now manufactures its products in China. Behringer is owned by Music Tribe, a holding company chaired by Uli Behringer.

History

Foundation and early development

Company founder, Uli Behringer, was born 1961 in Baden, Switzerland.  Behringer's father was a church organist and nuclear physicist; his mother a pianist and interpreter; his uncle a professor of composition at the Richard Strauss Conservatory in Munich; and his aunt a classical singer and pianist.  At the age of four, Uli Behringer started to learn piano. When he was five years old, his father built his own church organ with over 1000 pipes and integrated them into the family home. Behringer helped his father build the organ.  At the age of 16, he built his first synthesizer, the UB1.

Marketing, manufacturing, and acquisitions
While Behringer products were manufactured in Willich, Germany, many of the individual components were imported from mainland China. In 1990, to lower production costs, Behringer shifted production from West Germany to mainland China.  Initially, subcontractors were engaged to produce the equipment.  By 1997 Uli Behringer had relocated to Hong Kong to better supervise manufacturing quality.

CoolAudio acquisition

In May 2000, Behringer acquired the rights to the entire CoolAudio technology from Intersil Corporation, a US-based semi-conductor manufacturer specializing in integrated circuits for audio applications. The acquisition included an extensive intellectual property portfolio and licensees such as Alpine and Rowe, among others.

Music Tribe City
In 2018, Music Tribe opened its own factory, Music Tribe City, in Zhongshan, Guangdong, China. The factory handles the production and distribution for Music Tribe's 12 brands, including Behringer products.

Instruments 

Since 2016, Behringer has become a manufacturer of synthesizers and drum machines, which includes original synths, but also many recreations of old classic synthesizers, chips and hardware. Although some manufacturers such as Curtis are not happy about their products being cloned, Behringer has claimed that creating clones of older hardware is legal where the patents have expired.

In 2016, they released their first commercial synths the Deepmind 12 and Deepmind 6. Shortly after they followed by the Deepmind 12D which was a desktop alternative to the Deepmind synths. The design of the Deepmind was inspired by the Roland Juno-106. Their second original synth was the Neutron and their third was Behringer Crave, a semi-modular synthesizer released in 2019.  The next synth to be released was the Model D, a desktop clone of the Minimoog. The following year, the Poly D was released, with the same "D type" circuits as the Model D, but now with 4 oscillators and a keyboard. Since 2018, Behringer has produced clones of synthesizers and drum machines including the Roland TB-303, Korg Monopoly, Arp 2600, Arp Odyssey, Roland TR-808, TR-909, Roland SH-101, Minimoog, Sequential Circuits Prophet-600 and EDP Wasp.

Behringer is known for releasing their synthesizers at budget prices.

Legal developments

FCC dispute 
In February 2006, the US Federal Communications Commission (FCC) fined Behringer $1M, issuing a Notice of Apparent Liability against Behringer, claiming that 50 of the company's products had not been tested for conducted and radiated emissions limits as required by US law, and noting that Behringer continued to sell the products for a year after being notified. Behringer's position was that they believed that since the units had passed stringent European CE standards, they would also comply with FCC verification requirements. According to Behringer, it had overlooked the differences in testing standards and procedures under FCC and European requirements.  The company has since implemented a complete UL certified safety and EMC testing laboratory under the UL Certified Witness Program, including in-house audits and global regulatory review systems.

Legal cases 
In June 1997, the Mackie company (now LOUD Technologies) accused Behringer of trademark and trade dress infringement, and brought suit seeking $327M in damages. The claims were later rejected by the court.  In their suit, Mackie said that Behringer had had a history of copying products by other manufacturers and selling them as their own. The Mackie suit detailed an instance, in which Behringer was sued by Aphex Systems for copying the Aural Exciter Type F.  In that case Aphex Systems won DM690,000. The Mackie suit also mentioned similar cases filed by BBE, dbx and Drawmer. On 30 November 1999, the U.S. District Court in Seattle, Washington, dismissed Mackie claims that Behringer had infringed on Mackie copyrights with its MX 8000 mixer, noting that circuit schematics are not covered by copyright laws.

In 2005, Roland Corporation sued to enforce Roland's trade dress, trademark, and other intellectual property rights with regard to Behringer's recently released guitar pedals.  The companies came to a confidential settlement in 2006 after Behringer changed their designs.

In 2009, Peavey Electronics Corporation filed two lawsuits against various companies under the Behringer/Music Group umbrella for patent infringement, federal and common law trademark infringement, false designation of origin, trademark dilution and unfair competition. In 2011 The Music Group filed a countersuit against Peavey for "false advertising, false patent marking and unfair competition."

In 2017, Music Group filed a defamation lawsuit against Dave Smith Instruments, a Dave Smith Instruments engineer, and 20 Gearslutz forum users. The case was dismissed as a SLAPP lawsuit.

Controversies 
In March 2020, Behringer published a mock video for a synthesizer, the "KIRN CorkSniffer", which appeared to mock music technology journalist and synthesiser developer Peter Kirn. The video received criticism and accusations of using antisemitic imagery. Company founder Uli Behringer issued a response on Facebook, saying the video had been intended as "pure satire by our marketing department". The apology was deleted the following day.

See also
 List of microphone manufacturers
 List of studio monitor manufacturers
 Synthesizer clone

References

External links

 Company website
 FCC Notice of Apparent Liability against Behringer, February 2006

Audio amplifier manufacturers
Audio equipment manufacturers of Germany
Audio mixing console manufacturers
Companies based in North Rhine-Westphalia
Companies established in 1989
Guitar amplifier manufacturers
Guitar effects manufacturing companies
Loudspeaker manufacturers
Microphone manufacturers
Music equipment manufacturers
Synthesizer manufacturing companies of Germany